Switched-On Brandenburgs is a 1980 double album by Wendy Carlos.  It was the seventh album released by Carlos, and the fourth album in her project of classical music which also included Switched-On Bach (1968), The Well-Tempered Synthesizer (1969), Switched-On Bach II (1974), and Switched-On Bach 2000 (1992). It was the first album she released under the name of Wendy Carlos rather than Walter Carlos.

Switched-On Brandenburgs is a collection of all six of Bach's Brandenburg Concertos performed by Carlos on her Moog modular synthesizer.  Concerti #1, (most of) #2, and #6 were recorded specifically for the album.  Concerti #3, #4, and #5 had been previously released on Switched-On Bach, The Well-Tempered Synthesizer, and Switched-On Bach II respectively (though the second movement of #3 was re-recorded for this release).  The first movement of the Second Concerto had been recorded for the album By Request, released in 1975, however an updated mix is on this album.

Track listing

Disc one
"Brandenburg Concerto # 1 in F Major: Allegro"
"Brandenburg Concerto # 1 in F Major: Adagio"
"Brandenburg Concerto # 1 in F Major: Allegro"
"Brandenburg Concerto # 1 in F Major: Menuet/Trio I/Polacca/Trio II"
"Brandenburg Concerto # 2 in F Major: Allegro"
"Brandenburg Concerto # 2 in F Major: Andante"
"Brandenburg Concerto # 2 in F Major: Allegro Assai"
"Brandenburg Concerto # 3 in G Major: Allegro"
"Brandenburg Concerto # 3 in G Major: Adagio" (see note)
"Brandenburg Concerto # 3 in G Major: Allegro"

Disc two
"Brandenburg Concerto # 4 in G Major: Allegro"
"Brandenburg Concerto # 4 in G Major: Andante"
"Brandenburg Concerto # 4 in G Major: Presto"
"Brandenburg Concerto # 5 in D Major: Allegro"
"Brandenburg Concerto # 5 in D Major: Affettuoso"
"Brandenburg Concerto # 5 in D Major: Allegro"
"Brandenburg Concerto # 6 in B-Flat Major: Allegro"
"Brandenburg Concerto # 6 in B-Flat Major: Adagio Ma Non Tanto"
"Brandenburg Concerto # 6 in B-Flat Major: Allegro"

Notes

The Adagio of Brandenburg Concerto No. 3 is Carlos' own composition. J.S. Bach provided only a Phrygian cadence consisting of two chords (A minor and B) between the two movements in G major. The version on this album was composed and recorded in 1979 and differs from the 1968 track used for Switched-On Bach.

References

1979 albums
1970s classical albums
Wendy Carlos albums
Albums produced by Rachel Elkind
Columbia Records albums